Latina Calcio 1932, commonly referred to as Latina, is an Italian football club based in Latina, Lazio.

History
The club was founded in 1932 as Unione Sportiva Latina Calcio and subsequently re-established several times until 2009, when it attained the name U.S. Latina Calcio.

The team reached the Lega Pro Prima Divisione for the first time in 29 years, after being promoted from the Lega Pro Seconda Divisione group C in the 2010–11 season. In 2013, they were promoted to Serie B.

On 21 April 2013, the club won its first trophy, the 2012–13 Coppa Italia Lega Pro, after defeating Viareggio in the finals.

Their first Serie B season ended up in third place and eventually losing in the play-off final against Cesena.

At the end of the 2016–17 Serie B season, the club was declared bankrupt after failing to find a new buyer, with debts of over 6 million euros, meaning a new incarnation of Latina would have to begin from the amateur leagues. The club was refounded as Latina Calcio 1932 and competed in Serie D for the 2017–18 season.

Colours and badge
The team's colours are black and blue.

Current squad
.

Out on loan

Managers
  Francisco Lojacono (1972–73)
 Lamberto Leonardi (1976–79)
 Giorgio Puia (1983–84)
 Andrea Agostinelli (1994–95)
 Stefano Di Chiara (1994–95)
 Roberto Rambaudi (2004)
 Fabio Pecchia (2012–13)
 Roberto Breda (2013–14)
 Mario Beretta (2014)
 Roberto Breda (2014–15)
 Mark Iuliano (2015)
 Mario Somma (2015–16)
 Carmine Gautieri (2016)
 Vincenzo Vivarini (2016–17)
 Andrea Chiappini (2017–18)
 Carlo Pascucci (2017–18)
 Carmine Parlato (2018–19)
 Raffaele Di Napoli (2018–19)
 Agenore Maurizi (2019–20)
 Raffaele Scudieri (2020–21 (1-21))
 Salvatore Ciullo (2020-21 (22-25))
 Raffaele Scudieri (2020-21 (26-))
 Daniele Di Donato (2021- )

Honours
Coppa Italia Serie C
Winners: 2012–13
Lega Pro Seconda Divisione
Winners: 2010–11 (group C)

References

External links

Official site 

Latina Calcio 1932
Football clubs in Italy
Football clubs in Lazio
Latina, Lazio
Association football clubs established in 1932
Serie C clubs
1932 establishments in Italy
Phoenix clubs (association football)
Coppa Italia Serie C winning clubs